Irish Stew! is the seventh of the Nuala Anne McGrail series series of mystery novels by Roman Catholic priest and author Father Andrew M. Greeley.

2002 American novels

Nuala Anne McGrail series
Novels by Andrew M. Greeley
Forge Books books